The 1999 Navy Midshipmen football team represented the United States Naval Academy (USNA) as an independent during the 1999 NCAA Division I-A football season. The team was led by fifth-year head coach Charlie Weatherbie.

Schedule

Personnel

Season summary

vs Army

100th meeting (75th in Philadelphia)
Navy wore early 1960s uniforms
Roger Staubach, Joe Bellino, and Pete Dawkins appeared for the ceremonial coin toss 
Navy dedicated the win to two fallen teammates, Chris Wilson (died Tuesday), and Jason McCray (who died two years ago). The Midshipmen wore a patch in memory of Wilson, who died during a physical test at the academy.

References

Navy
Navy Midshipmen football seasons
Navy Midshipmen football